Malaya Serdoba is a rural locality (a selo) and the administrative center of Maloserdobinsky District, Penza Oblast, Russia. Population: 

References

Notes

Sources

Rural localities in Maloserdobinsky District
Petrovsky Uyezd